Mendu is a town and a nagar panchayat in Hathras district in the Indian state of Uttar Pradesh.

Demographics
 India census, Mendu had a population of 12,002. Males constitute 54% of the population and females 46%. Mendu has an average literacy rate of 47%, lower than the national average of 59.5%: male literacy is 57%, and female literacy is 34%. In Mendu, 19% of the population is under 6 years of age. Pincode is 204101.

References

Cities and towns in Hathras district